General elections were held in Panama on 13 May 1956, electing both a new President of the Republic and a new National Assembly.

"The National Patriotic Coalition was almost unopposed in the 1956 election race. The National Liberal Party made the gesture of offering candidates but did not campaign vigorously."

Ernesto de la Guardia Navarro, the government candidate, was a conservative businessman and a member of the oligarchy. The José Antonio Remón Cantera’ government had required parties to enroll 45,000 members to receive official recognition. This membership requirement, subsequently relaxed to 5,000, had excluded all opposition parties from the 1956 elections except the National Liberal Party (PLN) which traced its lineage to the original Liberal Party.

Results

President

National Assembly

References

Panama
General
Elections in Panama
Presidential elections in Panama